Dan Fegan (February 11, 1962 – February 25, 2018) was an NBA agent and lawyer.

Biography
Fegan graduated from Yale Law School and operated out of a Los Angeles law firm. His first client was Chris Dudley, a friend from Yale.

On March 10, 2017, Independent Sports & Entertainment announced that Fegan had been terminated.

Death
Fegan died in a car accident in Aspen, Colorado on February 25, 2018. He was survived by his five-year-old son, who, along with an unidentified 29-year-old woman, were airlifted to a Denver hospital with serious injuries in the same incident.

NBA clients
 DeMarcus Cousins
 Monta Ellis
 Kris Humphries
 Chandler Parsons
 Nene Hilario  
 Drew Gooden
 Ricky Rubio
 Jason Terry
 Larry Sanders
 J.J. Barea
 Dwight Howard
 John Wall

References

Further reading
 Abbott, Henry (June 27, 2010) "Powerbroker in action: Dan Fegan's draft day" via ESPN Sports; accessed March 10, 2017.

1962 births
2018 deaths
American sports agents
Yale Law School alumni
People from North Haven, Connecticut
Road incident deaths in Colorado